Giorgio Spizzichino (born 10 August 1999) is an Italian football player.

Club career

Lazio 
He made his professional debut in Serie A for Lazio on 28 May 2017 in a game against Crotone as a 79th-minute substitute for Wallace.

Loan to Cuneo 
On 17 August 2018, Spizzichino was loaned to Serie C club Cuneo on a season-long loan deal. On 17 September he made his Serie C debut for Cuneo as a substitute replacing Giuseppe Borello in the 78th minute of a 1–0 away defeat against Pisa. One month later, on 17 October, Spizzichini played his first match as a starter for Cuneo, a 1–1 away draw against Robur Siena, he was replaced after 56 minutes for Alessandro Mattioli. On 24 February 2019, Spizzichino played his first entire match for the team in a 0–0 away draw against Arzachena. Spizzichino ended his season-long loan to Cuneo with 17 appearances.

Pro Patria 
On 10 July 2019, Spizzichino joined to Serie C side Pro Patria on an undisclosed fee and he signed a 2-year contract. On 4 August he made his debut for the club in a 1–0 home win over Matelica in the first round of Coppa Italia, he played the entire match. Three weeks later, on 25 August he made his league debut for Pro Patria in a 2–1 home defeat against Monza, he played the entire match. Six days later, on 1 September, Spizzichino was sent-off with a red card in the 44th minute of a 1–1 away draw against AlbinoLeffe. On 13 October he scored his first professional goal and the winning goal of the match in the 23rd minute of a 1–0 away win over Olbia. On 10 January 2021, Spizzichino scored his second goal in the 20th minute of a 2–0 away win over Livorno.

Career statistics

Club

References

External links
 

1999 births
Footballers from Rome
Living people
Italian footballers
Association football defenders
S.S. Lazio players
A.C. Cuneo 1905 players
Aurora Pro Patria 1919 players
Serie A players
Serie C players